These are the official results of the Women's 100 metres hurdles event at the 1984 Summer Olympics in Los Angeles, California. The final was held on August 10, 1984.

Medalists

Records
These were the standing World and Olympic records (in seconds) prior to the 1984 Summer Olympics.

Final
Held on August 10, 1984

Semifinals
Held on August 10, 1984

Round one
Held on August 9, 1984

See also
 1982 Women's European Championships 100 metres hurdles (Athens)
 1983 Women's World Championships 100 metres hurdles (Helsinki)
 1984 Friendship Games 100 metres hurdles (Prague)
 1985 Women's World Championships 100 metres hurdles (Rome)

References

 
Sprint hurdles at the Olympics
1984 in women's athletics
Women's events at the 1984 Summer Olympics